Zinc fingers and homeoboxes protein 1 is a protein that in humans is encoded by the ZHX1 gene.

The members of the zinc fingers and homeoboxes gene family are nuclear homodimeric transcriptional repressors that interact with the A subunit of nuclear factor-Y (NF-YA) and contain two C2H2-type zinc fingers and five homeobox DNA-binding domains. This gene encodes member 1 of this gene family. In addition to forming homodimers, this protein heterodimerizes with members 2 and 3 of the zinc fingers and homeoboxes family. Alternative splicing results in multiple transcript variants encoding the same protein.

Interactions 

ZHX1 has been shown to interact with NFYA.

References

Further reading

External links